Brockley Whins is an area in South Tyneside, part of South Shields, with a postcode of NE32 [1]

It is served by Brockley Whins Metro station.

The name originates from a farm which was located about 400 metres East, in what is now the Biddick Hall Estate. ("Brockley" means "of badgers" and "Whins" is synonymous with "bushes"). When the Brandling Junction Railway (now the Newcastle-Sunderland metro line) was built (1839) it crossed the Stanhope and Tyne railway nearby. Sidings were put in place to connect the 2 railways together, and a station was placed there, named after the farm because it was the nearest habitation at that time. The modern estate was apparently named after the station.

External links

Suburbs of South Shields